Schoolcraft Township is a civil township of Houghton County in the U.S. state of Michigan.  As of the 2010 census, the township had a population of 1,839. The township was organized in 1866.

Communities
Boot Jack Point was a small mining community.  In 1890 it had 173 residents.
Gregoryville, is a town on the east side of the north end of Torch Lake. Gregoryville is named after Joseph Gregoire, who owned a large sawmill and became a successful lumber tycoon. He is referred to as "Father of the French Canadians" because he employed only French-Canadians.  He never married and died in California.  He had many siblings who also came to the area; only one brother, Delphis, remained in Quebec. He was the son of Joseph Gregoire and Anastasie Remillard. Families who lived in Gregoryville were: Gregoire, Dessellier, LaCasse, Drake, et al.
Henwood, an unincorporated community, mostly rural community west-northwest of Lake Linden on M-26 containing a pet cemetery
Incline, an unincorporated community north of Lake Linden
Larnouche is a rural unincorporated community in the township, northeast of Lake Linden
Lake Linden, a village on the west side of the north end of Torch Lake

Geography

Demographics
As of the census of 2000, there were 1,863 people, 798 households, and 529 families residing in the township. The racial makeup of the township was 97.69% White, 0.11% African American, 0.48% Native American, 0.48% Asian, 0.11% from other races, and 1.13% from two or more races. Hispanic or Latino of any race were 0.54% of the population. 23.4% were of Finnish, 19.5% French, 12.2% French Canadian, 11.8% German and 7.9% English ancestry according to Census 2000.

There were 798 households, out of which 27.9% had children under the age of 18 living with them, 54.6% were married couples living together, 8.9% had a female householder with no husband present, and 33.6% were non-families. 31.1% of all households were made up of individuals, and 16.2% had someone living alone who was 65 years of age or older.  The average household size was 2.33 and the average family size was 2.93.

In the township the population was spread out, with 24.7% under the age of 18, 6.7% from 18 to 24, 24.0% from 25 to 44, 26.9% from 45 to 64, and 17.7% who were 65 years of age or older.  The median age was 41 years. For every 100 females, there were 101.6 males.  For every 100 females age 18 and over, there were 94.1 males.

The median income for a household in the township was $27,440, and the median income for a family was $35,577. Males had a median income of $28,684 versus $21,146 for females. The per capita income for the township was $14,472.  About 11.3% of families and 13.7% of the population were below the poverty line, including 13.9% of those under age 18 and 19.9% of those age 65 or over.

References

Townships in Houghton County, Michigan
Houghton micropolitan area, Michigan
Populated places established in 1866
Townships in Michigan
1866 establishments in Michigan